Asalebria geminella is a species of snout moth in the genus Asalebria. It was described by Eduard Friedrich Eversmann in 1844. It is found in Spain, Portugal, Hungary, Russia and Turkey.

References

Moths described in 1844
Phycitini
Moths of Europe
Moths of Asia